The 1967–68 season was Cardiff City F.C.'s 41st season in the Football League. They competed in the 22-team Division Two, then the second tier of English football, finishing thirteenth.

During the season they enjoyed their most successful season in European competition by reaching the semi-final of the European Cup Winners Cup before being beaten 4–3 on aggregate by German side Hamburg. It remains the furthest a Welsh team has ever reached in European competition.

Players

League standings

Results by round

Fixtures and results

Second Division

League Cup

FA Cup

European Cup Winners' Cup

Welsh Cup

Source

See also

List of Cardiff City F.C. seasons

References

Bibliography

Welsh Football Data Archive

Cardiff City F.C. seasons
Cardiff
Card